is a train station on the Tenryū Hamanako Line in Kakegawa, Shizuoka Prefecture, Japan.

History
Ikoinohiroba Station was established on April 17, 1988, as a temporary station for use during the Shizuoka Prefectural qualifying games of the annual National High School Baseball Championship.

Lines
Tenryū Hamanako Railroad
Tenryū Hamanako Line

Layout
Ikoinohiroba Station is an unmanned station with a single elevated side platform, and a small wooden shelter built onto the platform.

Adjacent stations

|-
!colspan=5|Tenryū Hamanako Railroad

External links
  Tenryū Hamanako Railroad Station information

Railway stations in Shizuoka Prefecture
Railway stations in Japan opened in 1988
Stations of Tenryū Hamanako Railroad